Mycolysin (pronase component, Streptomyces griseus neutral proteinase, actinase E, SGNPI) is an enzyme. This enzyme catalyses the following chemical reaction

 Preferential cleavage of bonds with hydrophobic residues in P1'

This enzyme is present in Streptomyces griseus, S. naraensis, and S. cacaoi.

References

External links 
 

EC 3.4.24